Jean-Baptiste Tard is a Canadian production designer, art director and set decorator.

Recognition 
 2005 Genie Award for Best Achievement in Art Direction/Production Design - Battle of the Brave (Nouvelle-France) - Won
 2005 Jutra Award for Best Art Direction (Meilleure Direction Artistique) - Nouvelle-France -  Nominated
 2005 DGC Craft Award for Outstanding Achievement in Production Design - Feature Film - Nouvelle-France - Won
 2002 Jutra Award for Best Art Direction (Meilleure Direction Artistique) - February 15, 1839 (15 février 1839) - Won
 1988 Genie Award for Best Achievement in Art Direction/Production Design - Night Zoo - Won

External links 
 
 Nouvell-France Official website - Biography of Jean-Baptiste Tard 

Canadian art directors
Canadian production designers
Canadian set decorators
Best Art Direction/Production Design Genie and Canadian Screen Award winners
Year of birth missing (living people)
Living people